Lauri Laasi (born 12 September 1974 in Kilingi-Nõmme, Pärnu County) is an Estonian politician. He has been member of the X, XI, XII and XIII Riigikogu.

In 2000 he graduated from Tallinn University in social work.

Since 1997 he is a member of Estonian Centre Party.

From 2002 to 2009 he was a member of Tallinn City Council.

References

Living people
1974 births
Estonian Centre Party politicians
Members of the Riigikogu, 2003–2007
Members of the Riigikogu, 2007–2011
Members of the Riigikogu, 2011–2015
Members of the Riigikogu, 2015–2019
Tallinn University alumni
People from Kilingi-Nõmme